Pseudoproscopia scabra, commonly known as the horsehead grasshopper, is a species of neotropical "stick grasshopper" of the family Proscopiidae. It is found in South America in Brazil,Colombia, French Guiana, Venezuela and Peru.

References

Proscopiidae
Orthoptera of South America
Insects described in 1820
Taxa named by Johann Christoph Friedrich Klug